John Carter & Ken Lewis are English songwriters, who wrote many hits in the 1960s for various pop bands. They were published by Southern Music, and operated out of their recording studios in London's Denmark Street.

Personnel details
John Carter (born John Nicholas Shakespeare, 20 October 1942, Small Heath, Birmingham) 
Ken Lewis (born Kenneth James Hawker, 3 December 1942, Small Heath, Birmingham; died 2 August 2015 from complications associated with diabetes, Cherry Hinton, Cambridge)

See also
Carter-Lewis and the Southerners
The Ivy League
The Flower Pot Men
Herman's Hermits
Brenda Lee
The Music Explosion
The First Class
Mary Hopkin
Peter and Gordon
Paul Brett

References

External links
 

English songwriters